Llywel is a small village located on the A40, about  west of Sennybridge in Brecknockshire (currently administered as part of the unitary authority of Powys), Wales. The Afon Gwydderig runs through the village, not far from its source. Llywel also gives its name to a community. The main settlement in the community is Trecastle. According to the 2001 Census the population of Llywel community is 524, falling to 497 at the 2011 Census.

Etymology 

Llywel, occasionally referred to in texts as Llowel, is believed to be the name of a minor Welsh Saint. He is said to have been a disciple of Saint Teilo and Saint Dyfrig.

Church of St David 

The Church of Saint David in Llywel is said to have been dedicated to three saints: David, Darn (Paternus), and Teilo; and known as Llantrisant. Its name was changed when it was granted to the Chapter of Saint David sometime between 1203 and 1229

The church displays Perpendicular Gothic architecture. The grave of the writer and preacher David Owen (Brutus) is in the churchyard. As well holding a copy of the famous Llywel Stone, the Church holds the original Aberhydfer stone and old village stocks.

Llywel Stone 
An Ogham stone named the Llywel Stonebecause it was brought to the attention of the British Museum by the local vicar, Lewis Price, was found at Pentre Poeth Farm. (Pentre Poeth farm no longer exists. It was in the region close to Cwm-cynwal and Pant y cadno just off the road from Bwysfa fawr near Trecastle on the way to Belfont farm Crai. There now is a large water tank on the place where the farm stood, which now is on Tircapel (Ty'r capel) farm ground. Tirchapel farm is believed to be named after an ancient chapel, Capel Illud, and it may be that the Llywel stone originally stood at the chapel site. The site is along the Roman road from Caerleon to Carmarthen, the Via Julia Montana).
In 1878, the Llywel stone was acquired by the British Museum where it is on display. The inscription on the stone is 'MACCVTRENI + SALICIDVNI'. A National Park booklet provides a drawing of the Llywel Stone and states that copies reside with Llywel Church and the Y Gaer cultural hub in Brecon.

References

External links 
GENUKI: Llywel
Fforest Fawr Geopark – Llywel Community Page
Photos of Llywel and surrounding area on geograph

 Llywel
Communities in Powys